Thumbida Mane is a 1995 Indian Kannada-language romantic action film directed by S. Umesh and written & produced by K. Prabhakar. The film stars an ensemble star cast including Vishnuvardhan, Shashikumar, Shruti, Vinaya Prasad and Tara, besides a host of supporting actors. The music for the film was scored by Upendra Kumar and the audio was bought by Lahari Music.

Cast
 Vishnuvardhan 
 Shashikumar 
Ashok 
 Vinaya Prasad 
 Shruti 
 Tara 
 Umashri 
 Pramila Joshai
 Lokanath
 C. R. Simha 
 Abhijith 
 Dheerendra Gopal 
 Girija Lokesh
 Ashalatha 
 Anjali Sudhakar

Soundtrack
The music of the film was composed by Upendra Kumar. All the lyrics were written by M. D. Hashim

References

1995 films
1990s Kannada-language films
Indian drama films
Films scored by Upendra Kumar
1995 drama films